Waso Ramadhani (born 1 August 1984 in Bujumbura) is a Burundian defender who played with Simba SC in the Tanzanian Premier League.

He played 4 years in the Tanzanian Premier League, first by Young Africans FC and now by Simba SC. He represented his homeland on international level from 2002 between 2007.

References 
 

1984 births
Living people
Burundian footballers
Burundian expatriate footballers
Burundi international footballers
Association football defenders
Young Africans S.C. players
Simba S.C. players
Expatriate footballers in Tanzania
Sportspeople from Bujumbura
Tanzanian Premier League players